This list contains home stadiums that China national football team have used in international competitions / qualifications.

Background

Stadium
China plays in various stadiums in the country, and doesn't have a permanent home stadium.

Workers' Stadium, opened in 1959, located in the Chaoyang District in north-eastern Beijing, is the most renowned one. Its capacity is 66,161, and it covers a land area of 350,000 square meters. It is used both for international matches and by the China Super League team, the Beijing Guoan, and for the national team. However, China also plays in other stadiums around the country. Tuodong Stadium on the city of Kunming has the capacity of 40,000 and was used in previous 2010 and 2014 World Cup campaigns. Yellow Dragon Sports Center in Hangzhou served as China's main stadium for the 2011 AFC Asian Cup qualification and Shaanxi Province Stadium in Xi'an served as Team Dragon's main stadium for the 2015 AFC Asian Cup qualification.

Previously, Shenyang's Wulihe Stadium was served as the base for China's historic 2002 FIFA World Cup campaign, which saw China qualified, and their only, World Cup appearance.

In smaller tournaments like EAFF E-1 Football Championship, Chongqing Olympic Sports Center in Chongqing, and Wuhan Sports Center Stadium in Wuhan were used as home stadiums for Team Dragon. The recent China Cup also represents Guangxi Sports Center in Nanning as the team's main stadium. Some friendlies are also played in Tianhe Stadium in Guangzhou.

Home stadiums 

As of 1 February 2023.

See also 

List of stadiums in China
List of football stadiums in China

References 

China national football team
Football venues in China
Lists of association football stadiums
football
stadiums